Puku may refer to:

a dialect of ut-Ma'in language, Nigeria
a dialect of Noho language, Cameroon and Equatorial Guinea